Wycombe Village Historic District is a national historic district located in Wycombe, Buckingham Township and Wrightstown Township, Bucks County, Pennsylvania.  The district includes 56 buildings and 3 structures. Including a variety of residential, commercial and institutional buildings, with notable examples of Queen Anne and Bungalow/craftsman architecture. Most were built between 1891 and 1915.  Notable buildings include the Carver-Slack Farmstead (c. 1790-1820), Coal and Lumber Yard / Feed Mill (1892-1927), Wycombe Station (1891-1892), Edward Kirk House (1911), Albert S. Worthington House (1908), Cope Mansion (1899), Wycombe Hall / Cope Hall (1909), Warner S. Thompson Mansion (1901), Albert J. Thompson Mansion (1899, 1909) and the Wycombe Independent Schoolhouse (1913).  Located in the district and separately listed with the National Register of Historic Places is the Gen. John Lacey Homestead. Added to the National Register of Historic Places in 1985.

Gallery

References

Queen Anne architecture in Pennsylvania
Historic districts in Bucks County, Pennsylvania
1891 establishments in Pennsylvania
Historic districts on the National Register of Historic Places in Pennsylvania
National Register of Historic Places in Bucks County, Pennsylvania